Aia Ilu (in English, Garden Beauty) is a cultivar of domesticated apple, from Estonia, first developed in 1946 by Aleksander Siimon.

Characteristics

The Aia Ilu has large apples, weighing from 250 to 300 grams. It is juicy, bittersweet, and has a weak aroma. The Aia Ilu is grown in nurseries, but is not widely propagated.

Pests

The Aia Ilu has low scab resistance and is resistant to powdery mildew.

References

Apples
Apple cultivars
Agriculture in Estonia